The Chinese Stars is an American noise rock band from Providence, Rhode Island, formed in 2003.

History 
The band The Chinese Stars was formed in 2003 with several of the members from Arab on Radar, which had disbanded in 2002. The founding members include Eric Paul, Craig Kureck, and Rick Ivan Pelletier.

The band released their first album, Turbo Mattress, in 2003 through Skin Graft Records.

Members

Current members
Eric Paul (vocals)
Craig Kureck (drums)
Paul Vieira (guitar)
V. Von Ricci

Past members
Rick Ivan Pelletier

Discography
Turbo Mattress (Skin Graft Records) – 2003 
Cheap City Halo/Girls of Las Vegas (Artrocker) – 2004
A Rare Sensation (Three One G Records) – 2004 
TV Grows Arms/The Drowning (Kitty Play Records) – 2005
Listen to Your Left Brain (Three One G, Skin Graft) – 2007
Heaven on Speed Dial (Anchor Brain) - 2009

References

Musical groups from Rhode Island
American noise rock music groups
Musical groups established in 2003